New Love Crowd is a Brooklyn-based music project founded in 2014 by singer-songwriter Travis Swinford. New Love Crowd has released one full length album, one EP, and two singles.

History 
Before founding New Love Crowd, Travis Swinford was active in several other musical projects, including the band Plains. Although originally from Birmingham, Alabama, New Love Crowd is currently based in New York City. New Love Crowd's debut self-titled EP was released by Happenin Records and premiered by Impose Magazine.

In 2017, New Love Crowd was featured in Alt Citizen following a performance with Larry Sass and Champagne Supperchillin. New Love Crowd has shared stages with Paul Bergmann, Dougie Poole, Dark Tea, and Baby Jey, amongst others.

In January 2019, New Love Crowd released "Cotton Candy" on Maintenance Records.

Discography

Albums 

The Demos (2017)

Singles and EPs 

The New Love Crowd EP (2014)
Country Boy (2018)
Cotton Candy (2019)

References

External links 

 Official website

2014 establishments in New York City
Musical groups established in 2014
Musical groups from Brooklyn